Let Them Talk may refer to:
Let Them Talk (talk show), a Russian talk show hosted by Dmitry Borisov
Let Them Talk (Gary U.S. Bonds album) (2009)
Let Them Talk (Hugh Laurie album) (2011)
Let Them Talk (Marva Wright album) (2000)
"Let Them Talk" (Little Willie John song) (1959)
Let Them Talk (film), 1968 Argentinian film
"Let Them Talk", a song by Harry Connick, Jr. from Oh, My Nola

See also
 "Let Them All Talk", a 1983 song by Elvis Costello and the Attractions from Punch the Clock